This is a listing of releases by Schiller, a German music project. Schiller released their debut studio album Zeitgeist (Spirit of the Time) on 16 August 1999. Schiller has seven albums that have topped the charts in Germany, Weltreise (2001), Sehnsucht (2008), Sonne (2012), Opus (2013), Future (2016), Morgenstund (2019), Summer in Berlin (2021). Schiller has received two Gold awards and one Platinum award for their albums.

The single "Sonne" with Unheilig holds the highest entry of all the singles on the German Singles Chart with a peak position of No.12. To this day, Schiller have had minor success in the English speaking world, charting at No.17 in the UK with the single "Das Glockenspiel" and No.5 on the U.S. Dance Chart with "Leben… I Feel You" with Heppner.

Albums

Studio albums

Live albums

Compilation albums 

 A Future for the Michel (2005)
 Timeline (2012)
 Zeitreise (2016)

Others 

 Prologue (2005)

Bonus CDs 

 Atemlose Klangwelten (2010), bonus CD on Atemlos
 Sonnenwelten (2012), bonus CD on Sonne
 Horizon (2013), bonus CD on Opus
 Tal des Himmels (2016), bonus CD on Future

 Wanderlust (2019), bonus CD on Morgenstund

Einlassmusik 
CDs created for the live tours.

 Die Einlassmusik 1 (2004)
 Die Einlassmusik 2 (2004)
 Die Einlassmusik 3 (2006)
 Die Einlassmusik 4 (2008)
 Die Einlassmusik 5 (2008)
 Die Einlassmusik 6 (2010)
 Die Einlassmusik 7 (2011)
 Die Einlassmusik 8 (2012)
 Die Einlassmusik 9 (2012)
 Die Einlassmusik 10 (2013)
 Die Einlassmusik 11 (2016)
 Die Einlassmusik 12 (2016)
 Die Einlassmusik 13 (2017)
 Die Einlassmusik 14 (2017)
 Die Einlassmusik 15 (2019)
 Die Einlassmusik 16 (2019)
 Die Einlassmusik 17 (2019)

Singles

Other charted songs

Videography

Video albums

 2001 Weltreise - Die DVD
 2004 Leben - Die DVD
 2004 Live ErLeben
 2006 Tagtraum
 2008 Sehnsucht Live
 2010 Lichtblick

Music videos

 Das Glockenspiel (1998)
 Liebesschmerz (1999)
 Ruhe (1999)
 Ein schöner Tag (2000)
 Dream of You (2001)
 Dancing with Loneliness (2001)
 Liebe (2003)
 Leben... I Feel You (2004)
 Die Nacht... Du bist nicht allein (2005)
 Der Tag... Du bist erwacht (2006)
 Lichter (2006)
 Drifting and Dreaming (2006)
 Sun Meets Moon (2006)
 Tagtraum (2006)
 Das Meer (2006)
 Der Tag... Du bist erwacht (Orchesterversion) (2006)
 I Miss You (2006)
 Sehnsucht (2008)
 Denn wer liebt (2008)
 Herzschlag (2008)
 Wunschtraum (2008)
 Let Me Love You (Album version) (2008)
 Everything (2008)
 Mitternacht (2008)
 Sommernacht (2008)
 In der Weite (2008)
 Wehmut (2008)
 Forever (2008)
 Let Me Love You (TV version) (2008)
 Time for Dreams (2008)
 You (2008)
 White (2008)
 Ile aye (2008)
 Breathe (Dave Ramone Radio Edit) (2009)
 Try (2010)
 I Will Follow You (2010)
 Always You (Version "Paris") (2010)
 Always You (Version "Suite 211") (2010)
 Solaris (2012)
 Sonne (Alternative video) (2012)
 Sonne (2012)
 Sahara Avenue (2012)
 Lichtermeer / Sleepless (2013)
 Swan Lake (2013)
 The Future I + II (2015)
 Paradise (2016)
 The Wait is Over (2016)
 Once Upon a Time (2016)
 Not in Love (2016)
 Universe (2019)
 Das Goldene Tor (2019)
 Berlin Tehran (2019)
 New Day (2019)
 Avalanche (2019)
 Avalanche 2020 (2020)
 Playing with Madness 2020 (2020)
 Dreamforest (2020)
 Der goldene Engel (2020)
 Miracle (2020)
 Metropolis (2021)
 Summer in Berlin (2021)

Mixes & Remixes 
 1999 Sunbeam - Outside World [Schiller Remix]
 1999 Supanova - Don't Break My Heart [Schiller Vocal Remix] & [Schiller Instrumental Remix]
 1999 Trance Allstars - The First Rebirth [Schiller Club Mix] & [Schiller Edit]
 2000 Trance Allstars - Ready To Flow [Schiller Club Mix] & [Schiller Edit]
 2000 Tyrell Corp - Running 2.0 [Schiller Remix]
 2000 U 96 - Das Boot 2001 [Schiller Remix]
 2002 Apoptygma Berzerk - Until The End Of The World [Schiller Remix]
 2002 ATB - Let U Go [Schiller Remix]
 2002 Gregorian (band) feat. Sarah Brightman - Join Me [Schill Out Version by Schiller]
 2002 Sinead O'Connor - Troy [Schiller Airplay Edit], [Schill Out Remix], & [Schiller Club Mix]
 2002 Trance Allstars - Lost In Love [Schiller Mix] & [Schiller Radio Mix]
 2003 Mesh (band) - Friends Like These [Schiller Remix]
 2003 Moya Brennan - Show Me [Schiller Edit] & [Schiller X/Tended Remix]
 2004 Marianne Rosenberg - Er gehört zu mir [Schiller Remix]
 2004 Mila Mar - Sense Of Being [Chill Out Remix by Schiller]
 2004 Rammstein - Ohne Dich [Schiller Remix]
 2008 Bernstein - Paradies [Schiller Remix]
 2008 Klaus Schulze und Lisa Gerrard - Liquid Coincidence 2 [Schiller Remix]
 2004 Polarkreis 18 - Allein Allein [Schiller Remix]
 2011 Andrea Corr - Pale Blue Eyes [Schiller Remix]
 2014 Udo Jürgens – Ich weiß, was ich will [Schiller Remix]
 2016 Hélène Grimaud - Debussy: Préludes, L.117 (Live) [Schiller Remix] & [Schiller Remix Radio Edit]

References

Discographies of German artists